Horse Lords are an American avant-garde rock band from Baltimore.

The members are Andrew Bernstein (saxophone/percussion), Max Eilbacher (bass/electronics), Owen Gardner (guitar), and Sam Haberman (drums).

Their first album was released in 2012, after which the Horse Lords toured with Matmos, Guerilla Toss, and Guardian Alien, and played festivals such as Hopscotch Music Festival, North by Northeast, and Fields Fest, and released more albums.

According to Discogs the band "plays experimental music with elements of krautrock, post-punk, Appalachian and African musical traditions, polyrhythmia, arcane tunings and electronics. The band uses the just intonation tuning system favored by avantgarde composers La Monte Young and James Tenney, so the musicians are playing hand-modified guitars with repositioned frets, re-tuned and customized by [band member Owen] Gardner."

Pitchfork, reviewing their 2016 album Interventions, described their progress to that date with "The Baltimore band has released two albums up to this point, both of which alternate switchbacking studies in rhythm and drone with noisy, knotty studio experiments... Interventions marks a major step forward in every way: The jams are both more focused and more hypnotic, while the quality of the recordings has a newfound clarity and fullness"." Ben Ratliff reviewed Interventions for the New York Times, calling it "invigorating" and "daring and energetic", avowing that the Horse Lords were "borrowing sounds and techniques from Mauritanian guitar music, free jazz, classical minimalism and other places" including being "way into hocketing... This music feels very live, shivering with energy".

Discography
Studio albums
Horse Lords (2012, Ehse Records)
Hidden Cities (2014, NNA Tapes)
Interventions (2016, Northern Spy Records)
The Common Task (2020, Northern Spy Records)
Comradely Objects (2022, RVNG Intl.)
Mixtapes
Mixtape Vol. 1 (2012)
Mixtape Vol. 2 (2013)
Mixtape Volume 3 (2013)
Mixtape IV (2017)

References

External links
Horse Lords official website
Interview with the Horse Lords at Tiny Mix Tapes

Musical groups from Baltimore
American experimental musical groups